Vladimir Stoupel is a Russian-born French pianist and conductor.

He began studying the piano at age of three with his mother, Rimma Bobritskaia. He made his debut at the age of twelve, playing Tchaikovsky's First Piano Concerto in the Great Hall of the Moscow Conservatory. He later studied piano with Yevgeny Malinin and conducting with Gennady Rozhdestvensky at the Moscow Conservatory, and was a pupil of the Russian pianist Lazar Berman for almost five years.

Stoupel was a top prizewinner at the Geneva International Music Competition in 1986 and has performed as soloist with various major orchestras. His discography includes the complete works for piano solo of Arnold Schoenberg and of Alexander Scriabin (at the Piano en Valois Festival he played the entire cycle of Scriabin's sonatas in a single performance from memory). His recording of the complete works for viola and piano by Henri Vieuxtemps with violist Thomas Selditz was awarded the "Preis der deutschen Schallplattenkritik" in 2003.

As a chamber musician, he participates in the New York Philharmonic’s annual chamber music series at Merkin and Avery Fischer Halls. He performs regularly with violinists Judith Ingolfsson and Mark Peskanov, with the cellist Peter Bruns and with the Robert Schumann String Quartet. Singers with whom he has collaborated include Wolfgang Brendel, Elena Zaremba and Evgeny Nesterenko.

In 2012 he conducted the premiere outside Russia of Weinberg's opera Pozdravlyayem! in a German translation.

He currently lives in Berlin, Germany.

External links
 Official website
 Bach Cantatas website

21st-century French male classical pianists
Jewish classical musicians
Living people
Russian classical pianists
Year of birth missing (living people)